Muthill railway station  served the village of Muthill in Scotland. The station is now the premises of James Haggart & Sons LTD (A potato grower and exporter,) the site also has around 7 houses on it.

History
The station was built in 1856 for the Crieff Junction Railway, which connected the town of Crieff, four miles to the north, with the Scottish Central Railway at Crieff Junction (now Gleneagles).  The CJR was absorbed by the Caledonian Railway in 1865, which itself became part of the London, Midland and Scottish in 1923. The line and the station were closed as part of the Beeching closures in 1964.

References

Disused railway stations in Perth and Kinross
Beeching closures in Scotland
Railway stations in Great Britain opened in 1856
Railway stations in Great Britain closed in 1964
Former Caledonian Railway stations
1856 establishments in Scotland
1964 disestablishments in Scotland